Breña Alta (Spanish for Upper Breña) is a municipality on the eastern side of the island of La Palma, in the province of Santa Cruz de Tenerife, in the Canary Islands. The ayuntamiento (municipal office) is in the town of San Pedro, at 350 m above sea-level, and only 9 km south of the island's capital Santa Cruz de la Palma . Breña Alta lies on the main highway encircling the island, just north of La Palma Airport. Until the 17th century the area was known as Breña, but was then divided into Breña Alta and Breña Baja.

Breña Alta has a fishing port, an artificial beach at Bajamar, and an industrial area. The municipality is known for its tobacco production. There is a 100-year-old dracaena tree near San Isidro. There is also a zoo called Maroparque.

Subdivisions
The municipality has 13 subdivisions, or "parishes" (population figures from 2005):

Bajamar
Botazo (pop: 389)
Breña (pop: 509)
Buenavista de Abajo (pop: 484)
Buenavista de Arriba (pop: 605)
La Cuesta (pop: 684)
Las Letas (pop: 464)
El Llanito (pop: 758)
Miranda (pop: 711)
San Isidro
San Pedro (municipal seat) (pop: 2,434)
El Socorro
Las Vueltas

Historical population

See also
List of municipalities in Santa Cruz de Tenerife

References

External links
City Hall

Municipalities in La Palma